Left, Right, & Center is a weekly hour-long public radio program that provides a "civilized yet provocative antidote to the self-contained opinion bubbles that dominate political debate". The program is also distributed as a political podcast. The show is recorded each Friday, produced by KCRW in Santa Monica, California, by Laura Dine Million, although hosts typically contribute over ISDN telephone lines from wherever they happen to be.

After covering the week's events and speaking to invited guests about other topics of interest, each host gets a short period of time to rant about whatever they like without fear of rebuttal. Effective with the broadcast of July 7, 2017, the show expanded from a half-hour to a full hour and changed its long-time theme music—"Let's Call the Whole Thing Off", sung by Ella Fitzgerald and Louis Armstrong—with a new instrumental theme.  

In 2018, the show launched a spin-off, LRC Presents: All the President's Lawyers. Co-hosted by Barro and Popehat lead blogger Ken White, the show follows and examines the legal issues that orbit the presidency of Donald Trump. After Joe Biden became president, the show's title was changed to LRC Presents: All the Presidents' Lawyers, with "Presidents" now pluralized.

Co-hosts and guests
The show's regular co-hosts are the following:
 David Greene, co-founder of Fearless Media, represents the political center, and is the moderator.  Until July 2022, Josh Barro, columnist at New York magazine, represented the center as moderator. Until January 2015, Matthew Miller, senior fellow at the progressive Center for American Progress represented the center as moderator.
 Sarah Isgur, an American attorney, political commentator and former spokesperson in the United States Department of Justice in the Trump Administration.  Previous co-hosts on the political right include David Frum, Rich Lowry, editor of the National Review and Tony Blankley, editorial page editor of The Washington Times.
 Mo Elleithee, an American political campaign strategist and Executive Director at Georgetown University's Institute of Politics and Public Service, represents the political left.  Pervious co-hosts include Elizabeth Bruenig and Robert Scheer.
 Formerly, Arianna Huffington was also a regular member of the panel.

References

External links

 — discussion site abandoned near the end of 2018, but older posts still available.

American podcasts 
KCRW
Political podcasts
Public Radio International programs